Siti Nur Aliaa Mansor (born 2 August 2001) is a Malaysian racing cyclist &  track cyclist, who currently rides for Canyon SRAM Racing Team. Hafifi Mansor former Malaysia heavyweight & Faizal Mansor former footballer are her brothers. Aliaa Mansor is the first women from Malaysia and Southeast Asian to join the Spanish-based European cycling team.

References 

2001 births
Living people
Malaysian female cyclists
Malaysian people of Malay descent
Malaysian Muslims
People from Terengganu